Elmer Lewis Greensfelder (February 7, 1892 in Baltimore, Maryland - December 19, 1966) was a playwright and inventor. In 1911 he graduated from Johns Hopkins University, and later he used his degree to serve in World War I.

Plays 
In 1932 Elmer Greensfelder won a contest from the Drama League of America for his play Broomsticks-Amen!. Greensfelder also wrote the play Half Past Heaven. Some of his other plays include The Saints Draws a Daggar, The Crocodile Chuckles, Six Stokers Who Own the Bloomin' Earth, and Mark Twain.

Patents 
Greensfelder was an inventor with numerous approved patents, including one for "Method and Apparatus For Synchronously Producing Sounds To Accompany Motion Pictures". This patent was a system that would make sound automatically play while a motion picture was playing. Other patents include "Changeable Profile Toy" and "Loose Leaf Binder".

References 

Writers from Baltimore
1892 births
20th-century American inventors
1966 deaths
Place of death missing
Johns Hopkins University alumni